The International Congress on Medieval Studies is an annual academic conference held for scholars specializing in, or with an interest in, medieval studies. It is sponsored by the Medieval Institute at the Western Michigan University in Kalamazoo, Michigan, and is held during the first half of May. The Congress is the largest annual gathering in the field, regularly attracting over three thousand registered participants from all over the world. The 50th annual conference took place in 2015.

History 
In 1962, the newly established Institute for Medieval Studies at Western Michigan University organized a biennial gathering known as the Conference on Medieval Studies. By 1970, participation had grown significantly and the gathering was made an annual affair. Unusual for the time, the organizers issued calls for papers which were open to all in the field who were interested, including graduate students (see Scope and Participation, below). In the program of the 50th Congress, John Sommerfeldt reminisces about the inception of the humble conference as a place where "bright young scholars could be heard." The torch, as Sommerfeldt puts it, has been carried respectably by subsequent directors of the Medieval Institute of Western Michigan University, with increasing numbers of participants and insightful new approaches to medieval studies. The directors, following John Sommerfeldt, include Otto Gründler, Paul E. Szarmach, James M. Murray, and the newly appointed Jana Schulman.

In 1973, the Institute for Cistercian Studies was established at Western Michigan, and began to hold its annual Cistercian Studies Conference as a sub-set of the International Congress on Medieval Studies.

The Medieval Academy of America has held its annual meetings at the Congress in 1974 and 1982. The academy began sponsoring a plenary session in 1992 and maintains a committee for this purpose.

In 2020, due to rise of COVID-19, the 55th International Congress on Medieval Studies was canceled. The Congress moved to a virtual format for 2021, with both live and prerecorded session and a virtual exhibits hall.

Structure 
The Congress is typically held during the first or second week of May, and runs from Thursday morning through Sunday afternoon. Most events are held on the West Campus of Western Michigan University.

The archived schedule of the 42nd International Congress on Medieval studies, held in May 2007, illustrates the structure and events of the Congress as described below.

Sessions 
Sessions form the bulk of the activity at the Congress. There are three main types of sessions:
The vast majority of sessions are presentations of research. These sessions typically consist of between two and four presentations given by scholars in the field who present papers or other updates on the findings of their current research. Each of these sessions is organized around a theme under which the constituent presentations fit.
A minority of sessions are organized as roundtable discussions, in which a discussion on a predetermined topic takes place in at least a partially spontaneous manner. Short, prepared presentations are sometimes given as part of the roundtable.
A few sessions are organized as workshops, in which attendees are active participants. These focus on the teaching and practice of new skills.

Many sessions have a sponsoring group, although individuals or the Congress may organize sessions. Many of the sessions are sponsored by academic associations, universities, or publishers, while others are arranged by ad hoc groups which are interested in a particular topic.

Approximately six hundred sessions are held across twelve different time slots during the four days. Each session is scheduled to last ninety minutes.

Plenary Lectures 
Two plenary lectures are given during the conference, at the beginning of the day on Friday and Saturday.

Exhibits Hall 
The exhibits hall is open during the length of the Congress, and is composed primarily of book publishers selling their latest titles in the field of medieval studies. A minority of the hall also features handcrafts, music, and foodstuffs for sale. In 2007, approximately seventy exhibitors participated.

Meetings 
The Congress serves as a rare chance for international societies of medieval specialists to gather in person, and dozens of business meetings are conducted during breaks between sessions. Many groups use the opportunity to plan for their presentations later in the summer at the International Medieval Congress held at Leeds University.

Entertainment and Attractions 
The Congress typically features a film festival, screening movies which have a medieval setting or theme. There are also performances of medieval music and theater.

Some participating organizations sponsor social gatherings in the form of wine hours or open bar receptions.

There are also demonstrations, to foster an understanding of material culture, that vary from year to year. Past demonstrations have included a trebuchet, a longboat, and most recently, a demonstration of blacksmithing.

The annual meeting of medievalists corresponds with the nesting of swans at Goldsworth pond, located at the very heart of the conference. Most years Congress ends before the eggs have hatched, but the 50th Congress was late enough that medievalists got to enjoy watching the cygnets get their sea legs.

Scope and Participation 
The Congress is very broad in scope, being open to all topics related to the medieval period and to participants from any background. This has served to set it apart from other meetings in the field. Topics may range from discussions of mysticism, numismatics, and medieval Latin, to modern medieval-themed video games, the works of J. R. R. Tolkien, and the teaching of medieval studies in the classroom.

Such being the case, participants come from a broad variety of educational backgrounds. Most are professors and graduate students, but a significant minority is composed of architects, monks, undergraduate students, fiction authors, and other independent scholars and enthusiasts. Presenters are not necessarily experts in medieval history; scholars of literature, theater, religion, and art frequently give presentations.

See also
Conferences in Medieval Studies

Notes

External links
International Congress on Medieval Studies
Section on the Congress from Medievalists.net, with reports from previous years

History organizations based in the United States
Academic conferences
Medievalists
Medieval studies
Western Michigan University